Lingchuan County is a county in the northeast of Guangxi, China. It is under the administration of Guilin city.

The Yao of Lingchuan County consist of the Pan Yao  (Guoshan Yao ) and Red Yao . The Pan Yao live in Haiyangping  and other locations, while the Red Yao live in Jiuwu , Lantian , Gongping , and other locations.

Climate

Transport

Rail
Lingchuan has two railway stations, Guilin West Station and Lingchuan Station.

Guilin West Station is in Dingjiang Town, Lingchuan, on the Guiyang–Guangzhou High-Speed Railway and Hunan–Guangxi Railway Freight Ring Line. It's a Second-class Station and under China Railway Nanning Group's administration.

Lingchuan Station is a Forth-class station and is no longer handling passenger and freight business.

Bus
Lingchuan has a coach station. The coach line connecting all towns in Lingchuan and some other cities like Liuzhou, Hengyang.
The bus service between Guilin and Lingchuan are Route 301, Route 302, Route 306.
Route 301 and Route 302 is operating by Dingxiang Bus Service Co, Ltd.
Route 306 is operating by Tongda Bus Service Co, Ltd.

Highways
G72 Quanzhou–Nanning Expressway and China National Highway 322 are the main highways in Lingchuan.

See also
Wangtang, Lingchuan County

References

 
Counties of Guangxi
Administrative divisions of Guilin